The Trade Union Act 2016 (c. 15) is an Act of Parliament that amended the Trade Union and Labour Relations (Consolidation) Act 1992. It forms part of the UK's labour law. Passed during the second Cameron ministry, it was fiercely opposed by all UK trade unions. Alan Bogg, professor of labour law at the University of Oxford, described the act as authoritarian.

Contents

Section 2 of the Act introduced a new requirement of 50% of union members to vote in a ballot for strike action. It amended TULRCA 1992 section 226(2).

Section 3 requires that workers in important services (health, school education, fire, transport, nuclear decommissioning and border security) must gain at least 40% support of those entitled to vote in a workplace for a strike to be legal. 

It amended TULRCA by adding new subsections 226(2A)–(2F). This 40% is a floor on the size of a pro-industrial-action majority relative to the size of the union: a normal union can strike with (for example) 50% turnout and 26% support for a strike, 

Certain unions for public-sector workers would require either higher turnout (e.g. 75% turnout, with 40% of the members voting in support, 35% voting in opposition and 25% not voting) or striking to win a landslide victory (e.g. 50% turnout, 40% voting Yes, 10% voting No and 50% not voting).

Section 4 requires a review of electronic balloting. This was demanded by the House of Lords, during its passage through Parliament, since the existing law mandated the process of postal voting.

Sections 5 to 7 requires more information about numbers of people voting and about results to be given to union members and to the Certification Officer.

Section 8 requires two weeks' notice of industrial action is given to an employer (the employer can agree to one week), amending section 234A.

Section 9 limits the right to take industrial action after a strike ballot to six months, or nine months if the employer agrees.

Section 10 requires a "union supervisor" on each picket with an "approval letter" from the union, and must wear something that "readily identifies" them as the supervisor.

Sections 11 and 12 replace TULRCA 1992 sections 84 and 84A, requiring union members to opt in to a political fund, and be given details about how the money will be used.

Sections 13 to 15 concern trade union facility time and restrict deductions of union fees from wages in the public sector.

Sections 16 to 21 change rules surrounding the Certification Officer for independent trade unions.

Significance

The requirement in Section 2 for a 50% turnout means, in certain circumstances, those members who are not in favour of industrial action are better off not voting than voting "No".

Take for example the PCS Union pay ballot held in July 2018, which produced the following result:

Yes 50,726 (85.6%)
No 8,528 (14.4%)
Turnout 41.6%

Under previous legislation, this would have been sufficient for the union to call a strike, but there would have needed to be approximately 12,000 additional votes cast in this ballot to reach the 50% turnout threshold. As we can see from the landslide result, even if all 12,000 had voted "No", "Yes" would still have had a significant majority. So, if at least 12,000 of those who did not vote would have voted "No", they have successfully achieved their aim of preventing the union calling a strike by not voting whereas casting a "No" vote would have allowed "Yes" to act.

See also
United Kingdom labour law

Notes

United Kingdom labour law
United Kingdom Acts of Parliament 2016
British trade unions history
Trade union legislation
2016 in labor relations